Armillaria hinnulea is a species of mushroom in the family Physalacriaceae. This rare species is found only in Australia and New Zealand; in Australia, it is a secondary pathogen (i.e., causing disease only after a primary pathogen has damaged the host) of wet sclerophyll forests, and causes a woody root rot. A 2008 phylogenetic study of Australian and New Zealand populations of A. hinnulea suggests that the species was introduced to New Zealand from Australia on two occasions, once relatively recently  and another time much longer ago.

See also 
 List of Armillaria species

References 

hinnulea
Fungi of Australia
Fungi native to Australia
Fungal tree pathogens and diseases
Fungi described in 1983
Taxa named by Roy Watling